Zakharovo is a rural locality (a village) in Yurovskoye Rural Settlement, Gryazovetsky District, Vologda Oblast, Russia. The population was 11 as of 2002.

Geography 
Zakharovo is located 42 km northwest of Gryazovets (the district's administrative centre) by road. Isakovo is the nearest rural locality.

References 

Rural localities in Gryazovetsky District